Megacyllene menalaspis is a species of beetle in the family Cerambycidae. It was described by Chevrolat in 1862.

References

Megacyllene
Beetles described in 1862